Larry Phillip Fontaine,  (born September 20, 1944) is an Indigenous Canadian leader.  He completed his third and final term as National Chief of the Assembly of First Nations in 2009.

Early life
Fontaine, an Ojibwe, was born at the Sagkeeng First Nation on the Fort Alexander Reserve in Manitoba, about 150 kilometers north of Winnipeg. His first language is Ojibway.

In his youth he attended a residential school operated by the Oblates of Mary Immaculate at Sagkeeng. He also attended the Assiniboia Residential School in Winnipeg and he graduated from Powerview Collegiate in 1961.

In 1973, Fontaine was elected Chief of the Sagkeeng community for two consecutive terms. Upon completion of his mandate, he and his family moved to the Yukon, where he was a regional director general with the Canadian government.

Political career
In 1981 Fontaine graduated from the University of Manitoba with a Bachelor of Arts degree in political studies. After graduation, he worked for the Southeast Resource Development Council as a special advisor to the tribal council, which was followed by his election to the position of Manitoba’s vice-chief for the Assembly of First Nations. Fontaine was one of the Manitoba First Nation leaders who led the opposition of the Meech Lake Accord.

The Aboriginal Residential Schools Truth and Reconciliation Commission credits Fontaine for placing the issue of residential schools on the national agenda when in October 1990 he spoke publicly about the abuse that he and his fellow students had experienced at the Fort Alexander school. The next year, in 1991, he was elected grand chief of the Assembly of Manitoba Chiefs and served for three consecutive terms.

In 1997 he was elected national chief of the Assembly of First Nations for the first time. Following his first term as national chief, Fontaine was appointed chief commissioner of the Indian Claims Commission. Under his term the land claim of the Kahkewistahaw First Nation was resolved, resulting in a $94.6 million agreement for the Saskatchewan band. Fontaine resigned from the ICC in 2003 in order to run for national chief once again.

In July 2003, Fontaine was elected to his second term as national chief of the Assembly of First Nations. He ran again and was re-elected in July 2006 with almost 76 percent of the vote, defeating Bill Wilson of British Columbia. He was re-elected in 2006 on the basis of the "Getting Results" agenda, which proved to be successful. In his third term, Fontaine said that he would attempt to bring the $5 billion Kelowna Accord negotiated in 2005 with the Liberal government of Paul Martin back to the table. The deal, aimed at improving living conditions and education for Aboriginal people, was cancelled by the succeeding Conservative government.

In 2005, Fontaine successfully negotiated the Indian Residential Schools Settlement Agreement, which will mean a financial contribution of more than $5 billion to survivors and programs for them. The IRSSA, which includes a Truth and Reconciliation Commission, was ratified by the federal Conservative government in May, 2006.

In June, 2007, Fontaine, Prime Minister Harper, and Indian Affairs Minister Jim Prentice announced a process to establish an independent tribunal to adjudicate Specific Land Claims.

Fontaine has two children, Mike and Maya (May-a), and five grandchildren. His nephew Jerry Fontaine served as chief of the Sagkeeng Nation from 1989 to 1998, and was a prominent Aboriginal leader in Manitoba. Another nephew is Tim Fontaine, a former journalist and now comedy writer who created the satirical Walking Eagle News in 2017. It was noted by a guest on the CBC radio program DNTO on laughter (re-aired June 9, 2015) that Fontaine is a vegetarian.

In 2005, he was recognized as number one of the Top 50 list of Capital People of 2005 selected by Ottawa Life Magazine.

In 2009, he had a meeting with Pope Benedict XVI in order to obtain an apology for abuses that occurred in First Nations schools during the 20th century.

Since September 1, 2009, Fontaine acts as "Special Advisor" to the Royal Bank of Canada. His mandate is to "provide advice and counsel to RBC's Canadian businesses to help the company deepen its relationships with Aboriginal governments, communities, and businesses in Canada".

On March 29, 2010, Fontaine joined Norton Rose OR LLP (formerly Ogilvy Renault) as Senior Advisor and advises Canadian and international clients with First Nations matters, including Aboriginal law, energy, environmental and mining and resources.

He was made an officer of the Order of Canada on December 30, 2012.

In 2014, he was heckled by a group of Indigenous protestors at the University of Winnipeg due to his support for the Trans Mountain pipeline

Awards and honorary degrees
 National Aboriginal Achievement Award, now the Indspire Awards (1996)
 Honorary Doctorate of Laws from Royal Military College of Canada (1999)
 Honorary Doctorate of Laws from Brock University (2004)
 Member of the Order of Manitoba (2004)
 Honorary Doctorate of Laws from University of Windsor (2005)
 Honorary Doctorate of Laws from Lakehead University (2005)
 Honorary Doctorate of Laws from University of Winnipeg (2008)
 Honorary Doctorate of Laws from University of Western Ontario (2010)
 Honorary Doctorate of Laws from University of Guelph (2010)
 Honorary Doctorate of Laws from Queen's University at Kingston (2010)
 Honorary Doctorate of Laws from Carleton University (2013)
 Honorary Doctorate of Laws from University of Toronto (2017)
 Honorary Doctorate of Laws from University of New Brunswick (2010)

References

External links
Assembly of First Nations
CBC Digital Archives – Phil Fontaine: Native diplomat and dealmaker

1944 births
Living people
Assembly of First Nations chiefs
Members of the Order of Manitoba
University of Manitoba alumni
Ojibwe people
Officers of the Order of Canada
People from Eastman Region, Manitoba
Indspire Awards
Sagkeeng people